Eulepidotis dominicata is a moth of the family Erebidae first described by Achille Guenée in 1852. It is found in the Neotropics, including Costa Rica, Brazil, Peru, Guyana and Ecuador. Reports from Texas and Florida are unconfirmed.

References

Moths described in 1852
dominicata